Idol 2011 was the Swedish Idol series' eight season and premiered on TV4 on 4 September 2011.  Pär Lernström was the new host of the series, after Peter Jihde declined to return as host after Idol 2010. Two of the judges from earlier year returned, namely Anders Bagge and Laila Bagge Wahlgren, were joined in with two new judges, Alexander Bard and Pelle Lidell.

Winner of season eight was Amanda Fondell with Robin Stjernberg as first runner-up and Moa Lignell as second runner-up. Following the completion of this season, TV4 decided to put Idol on indefinite hiatus. In January 2013, TV4 announced that Idol would return in 2013.

Quarter-finals

Quarter-Final 1
Original Airdate 26 September 2011

Quarter-Final 2
Original Airdate 27 September 2011

Quarter-Final 3
Original Airdate 28 September 2011

Quarter-Final 4
Original Airdate 29 September 2011

Semi-final
Original Airdate 30 September

Finals

Finalists
(ages stated at time of contest)

Top 11 – Charts 2011
Original Airdate 7 October 2011

Top 10 – Swedish Hits
Original Airdate 14 October 2011

Top 9 – Hits from Superstar to Sweden
Original Airdate 21 October 2011

Top 8 – Big Band
Original Airdate 28 October 2011

Top 7 – Audition Song
Original Airdate 4 November 2011

Top 6 – Motown
Original Airdate 11 November 2011

Top 5 – My Breakthrough
Original Airdate 18 November 2011

Top 4 – Love Songs
Original Airdate 25 November 2011

Top 3 – Judge's Choice
Original Airdate 2 December 2011

Top 2 – Finale
Original Airdate 9 December 2011

Elimination chart

References

2011 Swedish television seasons
Season 08
2011 in Swedish music